The sand steenbras or striped seabream (Lithognathus mormyrus) is a species of marine fish in the family Sparidae. It is found in shallow water in the Mediterranean Sea and in the eastern Atlantic Ocean from France to South Africa. It also occurs in the Red Sea and off the coast of Mozambique in the Indian Ocean. The IUCN has assessed its conservation status as being of "least concern".

Description
Its head is about as long as it is high and its upper profile is slightly convex. The dorsal fin has eleven spines and twelve to thirteen soft rays. The pectoral fin is shorter than the head and has fifteen to seventeen soft rays. The anal fin has three spines and ten to eleven soft rays. The head and body are silver, the body being marked with about fourteen vertical dark bands.

Distribution and habitat
Its range includes the Mediterranean Sea, the Black Sea, the Sea of Azov, the eastern Atlantic Ocean from France southwards to South Africa, the Canary Islands, Madeira, the Cape Verde Islands, the Red Sea and the western Indian Ocean from Mozambique southwards to South Africa. It is found in estuaries and bays over sandy and muddy seabeds and sea grass meadows.

Ecology
The sand steenbras feeds mainly on invertebrates which it picks off the seabed. Its diet includes  gastropod molluscs, bivalve molluscs, polychaete worms, crabs, amphipods, copepods, sea urchins and small fish. It is gregarious and sometimes forms large schools.

As a protandric hermaphrodite, the sand steenbras starts its adult life as a male and later changes its sex to female.

This fish is caught for human consumption throughout most of its range but is not in general a targeted species due to its small size. The International Union for Conservation of Nature has assessed its conservation status as being of "least concern".

References

External links
 

sand steenbras
Marine fish of Africa
Fish of the East Atlantic
Fish of the Mediterranean Sea
sand steenbras
sand steenbras